Sospeter Temeo Ndenza is the current Bishop of Kibondo.

References

Anglican bishops of Kibondo

The Rt. Rev. Sospeter Timeo Ndenza attended Virginia Theological Seminary from 1997-99 where he earned a master’s degree in theological studies.  He was appointed the diocesan general secretary and the principal of Tabora Bible School owned by the diocese from 1999-2006. He was then appointed the sub dean of St Stephen’s Cathedral from 2006-07. In 2008 he was appointed the assistant bishop of the Diocese of Western Tanganyika where he served until December, 2010. In January 2011 he transferred to St. Philip’s Theological College in Kongwa, Tanzania and was appointed as full time tutor until April 2012 when he was elected the first Bishop of the Diocese of Kibondo.The doctor in divinity, honoris causa degree was awarded to the Rt. Rev. Sospeter Timeo Ndenza at Virginia Theological Seminary’s annual Academic Convocation in October 2013.  
 
The diocese of Kibondo is relatively a new Diocese which was inaugurated on 29th of April 2012 under the first Bishop the RT. Rev. Sospeter T. Ndenza. The Diocese started with 10 Deaneries, and now there are 11. 30 parishes, now 37; 70 congregations now 81 with 26,556 Anglican Members. The Diocese started with 34 Clergy, now 46 with 80 catechists. The Diocese covers two Administrative areas of Kigoma Region, which are Kibondo District and a new district of Kakonko. The Diocese has an area of 16,058 SQ KM, which covers the two administrative districts, with a total population of about 450.000. In which comprises 6 divisions, 24 wards and 75 villages. 
Prior to April 29th 2012 the Diocese was part of the Diocese of Western Tanganyika. As such its history of Mission Development is the history of the Diocese of Western Tanganyika. The diocese has a Bible School, secondary school. The diocese has nine departments which are; Administration, Finance, Mothers Union and Children, Youth, Development office, Christian and Secular Education, Bible school, as a Training center. At present, The Diocese has three vehicles, one for the Bishop, and two for missionaries. The diocese has three staff houses, which are Bishops house, missionary and rest house. However there are two foundations which we intend to construct staff house and Hostel or Guest house.
 
Unfortunately there has been several counts of money and Power misuse under the Leadership of Bishop Sospeter Ndenza. In 2017 this was first noticed independent by a German Doctor and a local working in the church named Bartholomew Lucas, Segu. As consequence of this Co-Workers international withdrew the Doctor from the health clinic project. After further people had noticed this in 2020/2021 all of the Expat staff that had helped develop the Bible and secondary school had left Kibondo. It is suspected that funds have been funneled to private ventures such as the Building of a private house etc.